Amalia Pica (born 1978 in Neuquén, Argentina) is a London-based Argentinian artist who explores metaphor, communication, and civic participation through sculptures, installations, photographs, projections, live performances, and drawings.

Early life and education 
Amalia Pica was born in Neuquén, Argentina, in 1978. She earned a BA from the Escuela Nacional de Bellas Artes Prilidiano Pueyrredón in Buenos Aires in 2003. From 2004 to 2005, she held an artist residency at the Rijksakademie van beeldende kusten.

Influences and work 
Pica was born in the late 1970s during the Dirty War, a period of state terrorism in Argentina. In light of this fact, Pica's work raises questions about the role of government, language and communication, and human connections. Much of her work explores fundamental issues of communication, such as the acts of delivering and receiving messages (verbal or nonverbal) and the various forms these exchanges may take.

Victor Grippo, Cildo Meireles, Lygia Clark and Hélio Oiticica, among others, were the artists that Pica first studied.

Strangers (2008–16) 
Pica’s performance piece, Strangers, first performed in 2008, was featured in the updated Tate Modern and focuses on the complex communication between strangers. The work requires two strangers to hold each end of a string of colorful bunting without letting it touch the ground in the limited space. The resulting distance creates a barrier that prevents the linked participants from having an intimate communication. Julie Rodrigues Widholm, director at the DePaul Art Museum, states that, “The bunting suggests a party or communal gathering, and Pica plays with the idea of distance and proximity as it relates to communication.”

One, No One and One Hundred Thousand (2016) 
In 2016 Amalia Pica participated in the group exhibition “One, No One and One Hundred Thousand” shown in the Kunsthalle Wien (Vienna). Amalia Pica was one of nine artists who were commissioned to create art that alters continually in contact with visitors; viewers were invited to mount and change the exhibition, resulting in an unlimited number of possible arrangements. The exhibition aimed to question the dominant role of the curator in structuring the exhibition. According to the Kunsthalle Wien, “the main actor of the exhibition will be the spectator who will not act as a consumer but as a co-producer of the artists and the curator.” Pica exhibited her series, Joy in paperwork (2016).

A ∩ B ∩ C (2013) 

In A ∩ B ∩ C (read as A intersection B intersection C), Amalia Pica uses translucent colored Perspex shapes, with which performers will produce different compositions in front of the audience. The notion of intersection links to the idea of collaboration and community. This artwork is a performative manifestation of Venn diagrams, which were forbidden from being taught in elementary schools during the 1970s, as the concept of intersection and collaboration were seen as potentially subversive by the Argentinian dictatorship.

The inspiration for Pica's exhibition, A ∩ B ∩ C, stems from the dictatorship in her home country of Argentina (1976–1981). A ∩ B ∩ C critically comments on the banning by the dictatorship of Venn Diagrams in elementary schools. In the Guggenheim Museum’s Soundcloud excerpt, Pica discusses her “Art Under the Same Sun” exhibition, housed at the Guggenheim in 2013, sharing her interest in the overlapping and intersecting of individual objects.

Amalia Pica (2012–13) 
Previously shown at the Chisenhale Gallery in London and at the MIT List Visual Arts Center in Cambridge, Massachusetts, the exhibition Amalia Pica uses everyday objects as signifiers of celebration: fiesta lights, flags and banners, confetti, rainbows, photocopies, lightbulbs, drinking glass, beer bottles and cardboard. According to the publishing house, & Pens Press, “Pica’s work is directly dealing with the translation of symbolic language and motivated by how meaning is created and deciphered between the artist and the viewer.”

Catachresis (2011-12) 

Metaphors are also part of Pica's work, as she uses figures of speech to describe things that have no name. "An object that has no name—that, in a way, escapes language—by invoking something entirely unrelated. Hence, we get phrases like ‘leg of the chair’ or ‘neck of the bottle’ which attach human qualities to inanimate things. Objects have a space and a weight, a physical presence that eludes language. You can’t speak an object: you have to speak around it. Metaphors are a way of doing that. In a sense, when we talk about the world, it's always in metaphors." Pica's Catachresis merges distinct and contrasting found materials, such as the leg of a table or the elbow of a pipe, to construct sculptural forms that become new tools of communication and take on identities of their own.

Venn diagrams (under the spotlight) (2011) 
Pica's interest in the relationship between text and image is evident in Venn Diagrams (under the Spotlight), which consists of two colored circles of light cast from theater spotlights to form a Venn diagram. The Argentinian government banned this diagram from being taught in classrooms in the 1970s, as it was thought to be an incendiary model of social collaboration. "The two circles of light are nothing but forms until the caption situates them historically, cluing you to their perception as subversive in the context of Argentinian dictatorship in the 1970s. I’m interested in the ideas that we project onto images and objects: how they resist as much as accommodate them."

Hora Catedra (2002) 

Pica is also fascinated with childhood. Possibly her best-known early work, Hora Catedra, explores the lessons and themes of childhood and how they irrevocably stay with us through adult life. In Hora Catedra, Pica proves how what we internalize during our childhood will accompany us through adult life: most Argentinians believe The House of Tucuman, the site of Argentina's Declaration of Independence, to be yellow, as it is shown in children's books. However, it is actually white. The 2002 site-specific installation bathed the building in a bright yellow light, in reference to the misconception.

Exhibitions 

Amalia Pica's work has been exhibited at the Museum of Contemporary Art in Chicago, the Venice Bienniale, and the Tate Modern in London. In 2014, her work was included in the group exhibition, Under the Same Sun, presented at the Guggenheim Museum in New York. Her artwork is part of MACBA, and the Guggenheim's collection.

Selected solo exhibitions

Selected group exhibitions

Recognition and awards 

Amalia Pica was awarded a CIFO grant, from the Cisneros Fontanals Art Foundation, in 2011. In that same year, her work was part of the ILLUMInazioni project in the Venice Biennale. Also in 2011, Pica received the illy Prize—aimed at celebrating the most innovative artist of the international art fair Art Rotterdam—and the Paul Hamlyn Foundation Award, established by one of the largest independent grant-making foundations in the UK.

In 2012, Amalia Pica was the recipient of The Future Generation Art Prize, which she received for an installation of her works focusing on communication and listening. Featured works are Sorry for the metaphor, Acoustic Radar in Cardboard, Under the Spotlight: Red on Red and Eavesdropper. The artist herself explains that “the way [she] installs [her] shows are more like conversations between different pieces…the works kind of shift meaning every time there’s a new company of other works.” Pica’s interest in human modes of communication extends to exploration of the human desire to be understood despite the imperfections of those forms of communication.

In 2013, she was one of the finalists for the Pinchuk Foundation's Future Generation Art Prize. In 2020, she was awarded the Zurich Art Prize.

References

External links 
 Video: "Amalia Pica – 'Can Joy Be a Form of Resistance?' | TateShots" from the Tate 
 Semaphores by Amalia Pica at King's Cross

1978 births
Living people
21st-century Argentine women artists
Argentine contemporary artists
People from Neuquén
Women performance artists
Argentine emigrants to the United Kingdom
Argentine women sculptors
21st-century sculptors